Hydrilla (waterthyme) is a genus of aquatic plant, usually treated as containing just one species, Hydrilla verticillata, though some botanists divide it into several species. It is native to the cool and warm waters of the Old World in Asia, Africa and Australia, with a sparse, scattered distribution; in Australia from Northern Territory, Queensland, and New South Wales.

The stems grow up to 1–2m long. The leaves are arranged in whorls of two to eight around the stem, each leaf 5–20 mm long and 0.7–2 mm broad, with serrations or small spines along the leaf margins; the leaf midrib is often reddish when fresh. It is monoecious (sometimes dioecious), with male and female flowers produced separately on a single plant; the flowers are small, with three sepals and three petals, the petals 3–5 mm long, transparent with red streaks. It reproduces primarily vegetatively by fragmentation and by rhizomes and turions (overwintering), and flowers are rarely seen. They have air spaces to keep them upright.

Hydrilla has a high resistance to salinity compared to many other freshwater associated aquatic plants.

Taxonomy and naming
Hydrilla closely resembles some other related aquatic plants, including Egeria densa and Elodea canadensis. Synonyms include H. asiatica, H. japonica, H. lithuanica, and H. ovalifolica.

Ecology
Hydrilla verticillata is allelopathic to the common hornwort (Ceratophyllum demersum) and prickly hornwort (C. muricatum), that is, it produces compounds that inhibit growth of the latter two species.

Status as an invasive plant

Introduction

Hydrilla is naturalized and invasive in the United States following release in the 1950s and 1960s from aquariums into waterways in Florida, due to the aquarium trade. It is now established in Canada and the southeast from Connecticut to Texas, and also in California. By the 1990s control and management were costing millions of dollars each year.

Specifically, a Florida west coast aquarium dealer shipped live Hydrilla from Sri Lanka under the common name "Indian star-vine." After these plants were considered unsatisfactory, they were dumped into a canal near Tampa Bay, where they flourished. By 1955, the plants found their way from Tampa to Miami as they were transported for cultivation and pet trade sale. It is believed that several undocumented cases of accidental or careless releases followed, as there was extensive spread of the Hydrilla throughout Florida and the southeastern U.S.

Problems
As an invasive species in Florida, Hydrilla has become the most serious aquatic weed problem for Florida and most of the U.S. Because it was such a threat as an invasive species, one of the first cost-effective broadscale herbicide controls developed was fluridone. Unfortunately, this single-use herbicide resulted in fluridone-resistant Hydrilla. “As Hydrilla spread rapidly to lakes across the southern United States in the past, the expansion of resistant biotypes is likely to pose significant environmental challenges in the future.”,

Hydrilla populations have caused economic, environmental, and ecological damage. Hydrilla is known to be an aggressive and competitive plant, even out-competing and displacing native species, such as pondweeds and eelgrass. Due to its competitive nature, Hydrilla has created monocultures, an area dominated by a singular species, rather than having a balance among many species, like in a normal ecosystem.

In Australia, Hydrilla can become invasive if the nutrient levels are raised in disturbed ecosystems, though is not generally known to be problematic.

Hydrilla can host a biofilm of the cyanobacteria Aetokthonos hydrillicola which can produce the brominated neurotoxin aetokthonotoxin which is the causative agent of Avian vacuolar myelinopathy, a fatal brain wasting disease of waterfowl and raptors.

Management

Hydrilla can be controlled by herbicides, as well as grass carp, itself an invasive species in North America. Insects used as biological pest control for this plant include weevils of the genus Bagous and the Asian hydrilla leaf-mining fly (Hydrellia pakistanae). Tubers pose a problem as they can lie dormant for a number of years, making it even more difficult to remove from waterways and estuaries. Hydrilla holds the advantage in that it can spread efficiently through both tubers and turions.

In 2011 the inlet of Cayuga Lake, one of the Finger Lakes in New York State, used the chemical herbicide endothall to try to head off a possible future disaster. The first year nearly $100,000 and numerous man-hours were spent trying to eradicate the Hydrilla infestation. Follow-up treatments were planned for at least five years. The City of Ithaca as well as other local officials are willing to pay the price because without quick action the plant could get into the lake and possibly spread to other Finger Lakes in the region.

In August 2021 “Hydrilla” was discovered growing in a small boat marina that is connected to the Niagara River in the city of North Tonawanda New York. The New York State Department of Environmental Conservation is involved and working to contain the infestation according to local TV reports.

In September 2021 according to local TV reports the Connecticut River Conservancy stated that hydrilla has been overwhelming tributary rivers, coves, inlets and riverbanks along the river for years.  Kelsey Wentling, a river steward at the Connecticut River Conservancy stated, "hydrilla can spread through a process known as fragmentation, in which the plants, due to some sort of disruption, break apart and regrow elsewhere. Fragmentation often happens when boats go through a patch of hydrilla. For this reason, it is critical that those using paddle boats, power boats, jet skis, and fishing equipment in the Connecticut River be aware of invasive hydrilla and then take steps to reduce its spread."  It has also been reported by local marinas and municipalities that they can no longer access certain boat slips and docks due to the density and severity of the hydrilla.  The Connecticut River Conservancy in Sept 2021 requested area boaters to complete a survey to help with the ongoing management of the invasive plant

Phytoremediation
This abundant source of biomass is a known bioremediation hyperaccumulator of mercury, cadmium, chromium and lead, and as such can be used in phytoremediation.

Medicinal uses of Hydrilla
Hydrilla is known to have many digestive and health benefits. The plant contains vitamins, minerals, and antioxidants, as well as being useful for fighting indigestion. The plant is also known for its extremely high concentration of calcium, vitamin B-12, iron and magnesium. As such, the plant has become an extremely popular superfood

References

External links

 Species Profile- Hydrilla (Hydrilla verticillata), National Invasive Species Information Center, United States National Agricultural Library. Lists general information and resources for Hydrilla.

Angiosperms of Western Australia
Aquatic plants
Flora of New South Wales
Flora of Queensland
Flora of South Australia
Flora of the Northern Territory
Flora of Victoria (Australia)
Hydrocharitaceae genera
Invasive plant species in Sri Lanka
Monocots of Australia
Monotypic Alismatales genera
Phytoremediation plants
Hydrocharitaceae